J. Jeeves was an English footballer who played as a defender for Sheffield United.

Playing career
Jeeves was an amateur player registered with Sheffield Club when he began appearing as a guest player for Sheffield United towards the end of their first season in existence. Although primarily appearing in friendly fixtures Jeeves did play for The Blades in both the FA Cup and the Midland Counties League.

References

Association football defenders
Sheffield United F.C. players
Sheffield F.C. players
Year of birth missing
Place of birth missing
Midland Football League players
English footballers